Flex is a nightclub in Vienna. It is located between underground station Schottenring and Augartenbrücke. Many international and Austrian music acts and DJs, such as Pete Doherty, Juliette and the Licks and Arcade Fire, have performed in Flex. There have been hundreds of visits from drum and bass DJs like: Pendulum, High Contrast, DJ Marky, Aphrodite, Patifee, DJ Hype, Logistics, Leopoi, and others. According to the annual rating of German music magazine Spex Flex has been among the best nightclubs in Europe for years. The soundsystem is also widely considered one of the best.

Flex Music 
Flex has been around for over a decade and has supported multi-cultural events from all over the globe. Primarily DJ sets and live sets are seen to be particularly common. Flex houses many DJs and in the late 1990s was primarily a club to listen to the newly imported music genre, Drum and Bass. In time however, Flex adopted a seven-day cycle, which was implemented in the first five years or so. There are several musical themes:

 Monday: Either "So Messed Up", which is mostly trash, techno and minimal or "Dub Club", mainly dubstep and jungle music. However, it is also                        often closed on Mondays.
 Tuesday: "Crazy", also called Electronic Tuesday, is a weekly minimal techno event.
 Wednesday: Mainly indie, pop and rock is featured on "London Calling"
 Thursday: Weekly drum'n'bass night called "Beat It"
 Friday : "London Calling Special", again mostly indie music and rock.
 Saturday : Mostly either "Wicked", a drum'n'bass, ragga and jungle event, "Crazy Special", again techno and minimal, or "Future Beatz", which consists mainly of drum'n'bass and drumstep.

Flex Soundsystem 
Because the system is very loud, Flex provides ear plugs free of charge for those who find it necessary to dampen the loud bursts of bass and sound. 
The main speaker system in Flex consists out of a mains stereo setup that includes 3 pieces of Alcons Audio QR36 in line source configuration (3 speakers stacked on top of each other with flush fronts) per side. For sub duty, there are two custom built concrete horns integrated into the stage crawl space. Each horn is supplemented by four 15" drivers.

For monitoring, there are two speakers for the DJ and another four around the elevated stage area, each speaker is half the size of the main, however a foot thicker. Another 10-12 speakers are placed around the club, at the entrance, in the midsection and next to the bar on the left hand side, with each speaker being similar to those on the elevated area. A sound and visual control which is usually present, is seen elevated between the midsection and the stage front.

Flex Café 
The Flex Café is a bar located right next to the Flex. It features couches and a small dancefloor which is hardly ever used. Sometimes there are DJs in the Flex Café, and there is mainly indie music playing. In spring and summer there are benches outside and sports events are shown on a large screen, however, bringing your own beverages is not permitted. Sparkling water is free in both Flex and Flex Café.

Culture in Vienna